Emil Lang (14 January 1909 – 3 September 1944), nicknamed "Bully", was a Luftwaffe flying ace during World War II. A flying ace or fighter ace is a military aviator credited with shooting down five or more enemy aircraft during aerial combat. Lang was credited with 173 aerial victories—144 on the Eastern Front, 29 on the Western Front—and one Soviet MTB sunk in 403 combat missions.

Posted to a fighter wing on the Eastern Front, Lang claimed his first aerial victories in March 1943. He was credited with 72 victories in a three-week period, among them an unsurpassed total of 18 on 3 November 1943. He received the Knight's Cross of the Iron Cross on 22 November 1943 for his 119 victories to that time. By March 1944, his claims totaled 144, for which he received the Knight's Cross of the Iron Cross with Oak Leaves on 11 April 1944. Transferred to the Western Front, he claimed his 150th victim during the Normandy Invasion on 14 June 1944. He scored his last three victories on 26 August 1944; on 3 September 1944, he was killed in action over Belgium.

Early life and career
Lang was born on 14 January 1909 at Thalheim, now part of Fraunberg in the Isar region near Freising in Bavaria, Germany. He was a well-known track-and-field athlete who ran the middle distances. Prior to World War II, he qualified as a civil pilot and flew with Deutsche Luft Hansa. Lang earned the nickname "Bully" from his 'bulldog-like' looks, characterized by his barrel-chested physique. He joined the Luftwaffe as a member of the military reserve force on 4 January 1938. From 8 May to 3 June 1939, he served with 8. Staffel (8th squadron) of Kampfgeschwader 51 (KG 51—51st Bomber Wing). On 26 August 1939, he was put on active duty.

World War II
World War II in Europe began on Friday 1 September 1939 when German forces invaded Poland. Following the outbreak of war, Lang served as a transport pilot with the Fliegerhorst Kompanie (Airfield Company) at Gablingen, flying missions to Norway, France, Crete and North Africa. On 1 November 1941, he was promoted to Leutnant (second lieutenant).

Lang was 33 years old when he was accepted for fighter pilot training in 1942. He undertook courses at the Jagdflieger Vorschule 1 (1st Fighter Pilot Preparation School) (3 July 1942 – 14 August 1942) and Jagdfliegerschule 5 (5th Fighter Pilot School) (15 August 1942 – 5 January 1943). He was then assigned to Jagdgruppe Ost (Fighter Group East) on 6 January 1943 and then to Jagdgeschwader 54 (JG 54—54th Fighter Wing) on the Eastern Front on 11 February 1943. Serving with 1./JG 54 (1st Squadron of the 54th Fighter Wing), Leutnant Lang was 34 and considered exceptionally old for a novice fighter pilot. His first three aerial victories were claimed in March 1943, and within a month he was transferred to 5./JG 54 (5th Squadron of the 54th Fighter Wing) of which he became Staffelkapitän (Squadron Leader) on 20 August 1943. Lang had already briefly served as acting Staffelkapitän of 5. Staffel from July to early August before he officially succeeded Oberleutnant Max Stotz in this function after Stotz was reported missing in action on 19 August 1943.

Before the year's end, Lang's kill tally stood at over 100 victories, with a remarkable 72 scored around Kiev in just three weeks during October and November 1943. He was the 58th Luftwaffe pilot to achieve the century mark. This series of multiple victories included ten on 13 October 1943 and 12 (victories 61–72) in three combat missions on 21 October 1943, which earned Lang his first of two references in the Wehrmachtbericht, a bulletin issued by the Oberkommando der Wehrmacht, the Wehrmacht High Command. During the Battle of Kiev, Lang set an all-time world record of 18 aerial victories claimed from four combat missions in one day on 3 November 1943, making him aviation history's leading ace-in-a-day. This achievement led to him appearing on the cover of the 13 January 1944 Berliner Illustrirte Zeitung (Berlin's Illustrated Magazine). Lang was awarded the Knight's Cross of the Iron Cross after 119 aerial victories on 22 November 1943, followed three days later by the German Cross in Gold.

On 9 April 1944, Oberleutnant (First Lieutenant) Lang was appointed Staffelkapitän of the 9./JG 54 (9th Squadron of the 54th Fighter Wing) engaged in Defence of the Reich on the Western Front. The Staffel was subordinated to III. Gruppe led by Major Werner Schröer. He became the 448th recipient of the Knight's Cross of the Iron Cross with Oak Leaves on 11 April 1944 after 144 aerial victories, all claimed on the Eastern Front. The presentation was made by Adolf Hitler at the Berghof, Hitler's residence in the Obersalzberg of the Bavarian Alps, on 5 May 1944. Also present at the ceremony were Anton Hafner, Otto Kittel, Günther Schack, Alfred Grislawski, Erich Rudorffer, Martin Möbus, Wilhelm Herget, Hans-Karl Stepp, Rudolf Schoenert, Günther Radusch, Otto Pollmann and Fritz Breithaupt, who all received the Oak Leaves on this date.

Western Front
When Allied forces launched Operation Overlord, the invasion of German-occupied Western Europe on 6 June, III. Gruppe was immediately ordered to relocate to Villacoublay Airfield. That day, the Gruppe reached Nancy, arriving in Villacoublay the following day where it was subordinated to II. Fliegerkorps (2nd Air Corps). Its primary objective was to fly fighter-bomber missions in support of the German ground forces. The Gruppe flew its first missions on 7 June to the combat area east of Caen and the Orne estuary.

In June, Lang claimed 15 aerial victories, including his 150th—a United States Army Air Forces (USAAF) P-47 Thunderbolt on 14 June 1944—and four P-51 Mustang fighters shot down in four minutes on 20 June 1944, plus another four P-51s on 24 June. Hauptmann (Captain) Lang was then made Gruppenkommandeur (Group Commander) of the II./Jagdgeschwader 26 "Schlageter" (JG 26—2nd Group of the 26th Fighter Wing) on 28 June 1944. On 9 July, he claimed three Royal Air Force (RAF) Supermarine Spitfires (victories 160–162)—no Spitfires were shot down this day: American historian Donald Caldwell noted that his claims were exaggerated but asserted Lang's ebullience, energy and drive made him an effective combat leader. On 15 August 1944 two P-47s, and on 25 August 1944 three P-38 Lightning fighters in five minutes. The hard-hit 428th Fighter Squadron, 474th Fighter Group lost 8 P-38s, its worst combat performance. The 429th also lost three P-38s. Not a single Fw 190 was lost. The Bf 109-equipped III./Jagdgeschwader 76 (Fighter Wing 76) were also involved and claimed six P-38s. During the day it lost 21 Bf 109s, three pilots killed and 18 missing.

He claimed three Spitfires in two missions for his final victories (victories 171–173) on 26 August. His victims most likely belonged to 421 and 341 Squadron RAF. Between 24 May and 28 August 1944, Lang had claimed 29 aerial victories on the Western Front, including nine P-51 Mustangs. On 6 June 1944, his group was the first to reach 100 aerial victories over Normandy, earning him and his group a second and final reference in the Wehrmachtbericht on 30 August.

Death
On 3 September 1944, Emil Lang was killed in action when his Fw 190 A-8 (Werknummer 171 240—factory number) "Green 1" hit the ground and exploded in a field at Overhespen. He had experienced mechanical trouble on the runway when he and the other aircraft of his flight took off at Melsbroek at 1.20 pm. Ten minutes later, Lang was still having difficulties raising his landing gear. Lang broke upward, to the left. Leutnant Alfred Groß saw Lang's Fw 190 diving in flames, its gear extended, but he lost sight of Lang when his own craft was hit and he had to bail out. Examination of both German and American records suggests that Borreck and Groß misidentified their opponents. The P-51 Mustangs of the 55th Fighter Group's 338th Squadron intercepted a flight of three to six Focke-Wulfs. Lieutenant Darrell Cramer took a high deflection shot at the Focke-Wulf on the left, which fell upside down in a steep dive and crashed hard into the ground; this undoubtedly was Emil Lang.

On 28 September 1944, Lang's commanding officer, Geschwaderkommodore (Wing Commander) Josef Priller, submitted a request for posthumous promotion to Major. In describing Lang's character, Priller said:
Captain Lang is a fully matured character, serious and calm in his demeanor, yet definite and energetic when strength was needed. Very good attitude as an officer. Demands of himself first. He understands how to reach the men under his command correctly. Captain Lang possesses an exemplary concept of service, has initiative and talent for improvisation to a large degree, well rooted in the National Socialist ideas.
The commander of the II. Jagdkorps (2nd Fighter Corps), Generalleutnant (Major General) Alfred Bülowius, concurred with the assessment. Despite these recommendations, Emil Lang did not receive a posthumous promotion to Major.

Summary of career

Aerial victory claims
According to US historian David T. Zabecki, Lang was credited with 173 aerial victories. Mathews and Foreman, authors of Luftwaffe Aces — Biographies and Victory Claims, researched the German Federal Archives and found records for 172 aerial victory claims. This number includes 141 aerial victories on the Eastern Front and 31 on the Western Front, including one four-engined bomber.

Victory claims were logged to a map-reference (PQ = Planquadrat), for example "PQ 36 Ost 00333". These sectors were then subdivided into 36 smaller units to give a location area 3 × 4 km in size.

Awards
War Merit Cross 2nd Class with Swords (24 October 1940)
Front Flying Clasp of the Luftwaffe for Fighter Pilots
 in Bronze (23 March 1943)
 Silver (14 May 1943)
 Gold (25 June 1943)
Honorary Cup of the Luftwaffe (27 October 1943)
German Cross in Gold on 25 November 1943 as Leutnant in the II./Jagdgeschwader 54
Iron Cross (1939)
 2nd class (13 June 1943)
 1st class (2 August 1943)
Knight's Cross of the Iron Cross with Oak Leaves
 Knight's Cross on 22 November 1943 as Leutnant (war officer) and Staffelführer of the 9./Jagdgeschwader 54
 448th Oak Leaves on 11 April 1944 as Oberleutnant (war officer) and Staffelkapitän of the 9./Jagdgeschwader 54

Dates of rank

Notes

References

Citations

Bibliography

 
 
 
 
 
 
 
 
 
 
 
 
 
 
 
 
 
 
 
 

1909 births
1944 deaths
People from Erding (district)
Luftwaffe pilots
People from the Kingdom of Bavaria
German World War II flying aces
Luftwaffe personnel killed in World War II
Aviators killed by being shot down
Recipients of the Gold German Cross
Recipients of the Knight's Cross of the Iron Cross with Oak Leaves
Burials at Lommel German war cemetery
Military personnel from Bavaria